Zmysłowo may refer to the following places:
Zmysłowo, Gmina Jutrosin in Greater Poland Voivodeship (west-central Poland)
Zmysłowo, Gmina Miejska Górka in Greater Poland Voivodeship (west-central Poland)
Zmysłowo, Środa Wielkopolska County in Greater Poland Voivodeship (west-central Poland)